Red Branch may refer to :

Red Branch Cycle (or Ulster Cycle) legends and sagas of heroes of Ulster

Red Branch, Texas, an unincorporated community in Trinity County, Texas
Red Branch (novel), (1989), novelisation of the life of the Irish hero Cú Chulainn by the Irish-American author Morgan Llywelyn

See also
Red Hand of Ulster
Red-giant branch